Alison Littlewood is a British author of horror novels and short stories. She also writes under the name Alison J. Littlewood and the pen name A. J. Elwood. She currently lives in Doncaster, South Yorkshire with her partner.

Bibliography
A Cold Season (2012)
Path of Needles (2013)
The Unquiet House (2014)
Zombie Apocalypse! Acapulcalypse Now (2015)
A Cold Silence (2015)
The Hidden People (2016)
 The Crow Garden (2017)
 Mistletoe (2019)
 The Cottingley Cuckoo (April 2021) – using the pen name A. J. Elwood
 The Other Lives of Miss Emily White (April 2023) – using the pen name A. J. Elwood

Awards
August Derleth Award for Path of Needles (2014, nominated)
Shirley Jackson Award for The Unquiet House (2015, nominated)
 Shirley Jackson Award for Short Fiction: "The Dogs Home" (The Spectral Book of Horror Stories, Spectral Press). (2015, winner)
August Derleth Award for The Unquiet House (2015, nominated)
August Derleth Award for A Cold Silence (2016, nominated)

References

External links
 
 
 Wolves and Witches and Bears by Alison Littlewood at Dread Central

British horror writers
People from Wakefield
Living people
Year of birth missing (living people)
English women novelists
21st-century pseudonymous writers
Pseudonymous women writers